Marion Tournon-Branly (23 September 1924 – 15 May 2016) was a French architect. She was born in Paris to architect Paul Tournon and painter Élisabeth Branly (daughter of Edouard Branly). After studying at the École nationale supérieure des Beaux-Arts, she collaborated with her father and with Auguste Perret.

She designed villas, elementary schools, buildings for the Fleury Abbey and the modern church of the Fontenelle Abbey.

References 

1924 births
2016 deaths
French women architects
20th-century French architects
École des Beaux-Arts alumni
Architects of Roman Catholic churches
Architects from Paris
20th-century French women